The UK Rock & Metal Albums Chart is a record chart which ranks the best-selling rock and heavy metal albums in the United Kingdom. Compiled and published by the Official Charts Company, the data is based on each album's weekly physical sales, digital downloads and streams. In 2011, there were 25 albums that topped the 52 published charts. The first number-one album of the year was the Led Zeppelin compilation Mothership, which was released in 2007. The first new number-one album of the year was The Wörld Is Yours, the twentieth studio album by Motörhead. The final number-one album of the year was Here and Now, the seventh studio album by Canadian band Nickelback, which reached number one for the week ending 3 December and remained there for five consecutive weeks until the end of the year.

The most successful album on the UK Rock & Metal Albums Chart in 2011 was Wasting Light, the seventh studio album by American alternative rock band Foo Fighters, which spent a total of 13 weeks at number one. This included a single run of seven consecutive weeks from 23 April to 4 June and another four-week stint between 16 July and 6 August. Wasting Light was the best-selling rock and metal release of the year, ranking 24th in the UK End of Year Albums Chart. Linkin Park's fourth studio album A Thousand Suns, the 2009 Foo Fighters Greatest Hits compilation and Nickelback's Here and Now each spent five weeks at number one, while the self-titled third studio album by Evanescence was number one for four weeks in 2011. One album, Mothership by Led Zeppelin, spent two weeks at number one on the chart in 2011.

Chart history

See also
2011 in British music
List of UK Rock & Metal Singles Chart number ones of 2011

References

External links
Official UK Rock & Metal Albums Chart Top 40 at the Official Charts Company
The Official UK Top 40 Rock Albums at BBC Radio 1

2011 in British music
United Kingdom Rock and Metal Albums
2011